Hugo Tristram Engelhardt Jr. (April 27, 1941 – June 21, 2018) was an American philosopher, holding doctorates in both philosophy from the University of Texas at Austin and medicine from Tulane University. He was a professor of philosophy at Rice University, in Houston, Texas, specializing in the history and philosophy of medicine, particularly from the standpoint of continental philosophy. He was also a professor emeritus at Baylor College of Medicine, and a member of the Baylor Center for Medical Ethics and Health Policy.

He was formerly the editor-in-chief of The Journal of Medicine and Philosophy and Christian Bioethics. He also edited the book series  "Philosophy and Medicine". He was a fellow of the Hastings Center, an independent bioethics research institute. He also wrote the book  "Handbook of Psychiatry volume 30"  cowritten with Javad Nurbakhsh;  and Hamideh Jahangiri. 

Engelhardt was raised Roman Catholic, but in 1991 he entered the Eastern Orthodox Church.

See also
American philosophy
List of American philosophers
Philosophy of medicine

References

External links
 Faculty Page at Rice University
 CV at Rice University
 The Journal of Medicine and Philosophy

1941 births
2018 deaths
Christian continental philosophers and theologians
Philosophers from Texas
American philosophy academics
Rice University faculty
Tulane University School of Medicine alumni
University of Texas at Austin College of Liberal Arts alumni
Baylor College of Medicine physicians and researchers
Eastern Orthodox Christians from the United States
Converts to Eastern Orthodoxy from Roman Catholicism
Hastings Center Fellows
Members of the European Academy of Sciences and Arts
Medical journal editors
Writers from Texas